Indeogwon Station is a metro station on the Gwacheon Line located in Gwanyang-dong, Dongan-gu, Anyang, at the Indeogwon-sageori. Due to the station's relative closeness to Poil-dong in the neighboring city of Uiwang, many people from the nearby districts also use the station, and there is a bus that is accessible through exit 2 that connects the station to Pangyo, Seongnam. It will be a transfer station to the Gyeonggang Line in 2024.

Station layout

Neighborhood 
 Cheonggyesa

References

Metro stations in Anyang, Gyeonggi
Seoul Metropolitan Subway stations
Railway stations opened in 1993